Peoria longipalpella, the long-palps peorium, is a species of pyralid moth in the family Pyralidae.

The MONA or Hodges number for Peoria longipalpella is 6042.

References

Further reading

External links

 

Phycitinae
Moths described in 1887
Taxa named by Émile Louis Ragonot